Montrose is a rural locality in the Western Downs Region, Queensland, Australia.

History 
The locality takes its name from the parish and the pastoral run name, which pastoralist St George Richard Gore named on 5 May 1866 after the town of Montrose in Forfarshire, Scotland.

Malara Provisional School and Montrose Provision School both opened circa 1911 as half-time provisional schools (meaning they shared a single teacher between them). In 1919 both schools closed due to low student numbers.

References 

Western Downs Region
Localities in Queensland